Dendrobium section Dendrobium is a section of the genus Dendrobium.

Description
Plants in this section have moderate length thin pseudobulbs with leaves at upper two thirds of the pseudobulb.

Distribution
Plants from this section are found from India to New Guinea and Australia in the east and Japan and Korea.

Species
Dendrobium section Dendrobium comprises the following species:

References

Orchid subgenera